Adolf Macek (16 December 1939 – 20 July 1993) was an Austrian footballer. He played in four matches for the Austria national football team from 1965 to 1966.

References

External links
 

1939 births
1993 deaths
Austrian footballers
Austria international footballers
Place of birth missing
Association footballers not categorized by position